Kimchi Chronicles is an American food program airing on PBS that is part travelogue, part food narrative, and part documentary of self-discovery. Host Marja Vongerichten, a Korean American-Adoptee, explores Korean food and culture, and her unique life story is told throughout the series. In the show, viewers experience Korea through Marja's distinct perspective.

Each episode begins in Korea, where Marja, her husband Jean-Georges Vongerichten, and other special guests travel to different areas of Korea and taste their local foods. Then, they return to New York, where they recreate Korean recipes, specifically tailored for a modern American kitchen. Episodes cover different categories of food, providing a comprehensive overview of Korean food.

The show features acclaimed chef Jean-Georges Vongerichten, actress Heather Graham, and actor Hugh Jackman and his wife, actress Deborra-Lee Furness who are also upstairs neighbors in New York City of the Vongerichten family.

The show was sponsored by the Visit Korea Committee, Korean Food Foundation, Ministry of Culture, Sports and Tourism and Ministry for Food, Agriculture, Forestry and Fisheries.

The production company for the show was Frappé, Inc., which is owned by Charles Pinsky.

Episode list

Other media
In August 2011, Rodale, Inc. published a hardcover companion cookbook, The Kimchi Chronicles: Korean Cooking for an American Kitchen, written by Marja Vongerichten with Julia Turshen.

The 13-episode series was released on DVD in October 2011.

On October 16, 2012, Marja Vongerichten was a guest speaker at the George Washington University Jack Morton Auditorium, where she presented a humorous lecture about the Kimchi Chronicles, Korean culture, and her biracial identity. The Korean Cultural Center, Embassy of the Republic of Korea, organized and sponsored the event.

Books 
 Vongerichten, Marja; (foreword by Jean Georges Vongerichten), The Kimchi Chronicles: Korean cooking for an American kitchen, Emmaus, PA: Rodale Books, 2011.

References

Further reading
 "Celebrity Chef's Wife Returns to Ancestral Home", The Chosun Ilbo newspaper, South Korea, June 29, 2010
 Leach, Robin, "‘Kimchi Chronicles’ chef Marja Vongerichten is still searching for her father", Las Vegas Sun, Wednesday, May 16, 2012

External links 
 Official Website
 Official Blog

Food travelogue television series
PBS original programming
Korean cuisine
Television shows set in South Korea
2010s American cooking television series
2011 American television series debuts
2011 American television series endings